Homeobox protein Hox-A1 is a protein that in humans is encoded by the HOXA1 gene.

Gene 
Two transcript variants encoding two different isoforms have been found for this gene, with only one of the isoforms containing the homeodomain region.

Function 
In vertebrates, the genes encoding the class of transcription factors called homeobox genes are found in clusters named A, B, C, and D on four separate chromosomes. Expression of these proteins is spatially and temporally regulated during embryonic development. This gene is part of the A cluster on chromosome 7 and encodes a DNA-binding transcription factor which may regulate gene expression, morphogenesis, and cellular differentiation. The homeobox protein Hox-A1 may be involved in the placement of hindbrain segments in the proper location along the anterior-posterior axis during development.

Clinical significance 
A common polymorphism in the HOXA1 gene is associated with a susceptibility to autism spectrum disorder, with individuals possessing these gene variant have an approximately doubled risk of developing the disorder. Studies on knockout mice have indicated that the gene can alter embryological development of the brain stem (specifically the facial and superior olivary nuclei), as well as induce several other physical changes such as in ear shape. Both of these sets of changes can also be seen in patients with autism.

Other HOXA1 mutations are associated with Bosley-Salih-Alorainy syndrome (BSAS) or the Athabascan brainstem dysgenesis syndrome (ABDS).

Regulation 
The HOXA1 gene is repressed by the microRNA miR-10a.

See also 
 Homeobox

References

Further reading

External links 
 

Transcription factors